Theodore Shigeru Kanamine (August 29, 1929 – March 2, 2023) was a United States Army brigadier general and the first Japanese-American active duty general in the United States military. Serving in the military police, he led the investigation of the Mỹ Lai Massacre in 1968.

Born in California, Kanamine and his family were relocated to an internment camp when he was 12-years-old.

Early life
Kanamine was born in Hollywood, California, on August 29, 1929. His parents were Japanese-American immigrants and he had a younger sister. In 1942, at age 12, Kanamine and his family were relocated to an internment camp in Jerome, Arkansas following the signing of Executive Order 9066. After their release, the family moved to Nebraska. He attended the University of Nebraska-Lincoln, where he studied criminal psychology; he later enrolled in the university's law school, graduating in 1954. That year, he married Mary Stuben, a fellow graduate. Due to Nebraska state laws restricting interracial marriages, the couple wed in Council Bluffs, Iowa.

Career
After commissioning as a second lieutenant through the Reserve Officer Training Corps, Kanamine joined active service with a military police unit in 1955. He would later serve with Military Assistance Command, Vietnam in Saigon and participated in the Tet Offensive. He later led the investigation of the Mỹ Lai Massacre; the 1968 incident saw soldiers from the US 23rd Infantry Division kill hundreds of unarmed people. During his career, Kanamine served as an aide to General Creighton Abrams, who recommended his promotion to brigadier general. In 1979, while in the capacity of provost marshal of United States Army, Europe and Seventh United States Army, he oversaw efforts to combat drug abuse amongst American armed forces in Germany. He retired in 1981.

References 

1929 births
2023 deaths
People from Hollywood, Los Angeles
American people of Japanese descent
Japanese-American internees
University of Nebraska–Lincoln alumni
American military personnel of Japanese descent
American generals
Recipients of the Distinguished Service Medal (US Army)
Recipients of the Legion of Merit